The Blue Squadron is a 1934 Anglo-Italian aviation drama film directed by George King and starring Esmond Knight and John Stuart.  The film was a co-production between Britain's Teddington Studios (the UK arm of Warner Brothers) and Italy's Pittaluga studios.  Although made under quota quickie conditions, the film seems to have enjoyed a rather more generous budget than was the norm with such productions and was able to include convincing location shots in the snowy Italian mountains.

The film deals with two young officers in the Italian Royal Air Force (Knight and Stuart) competing for the hand of the attractive Elena (Greta Hansen) and finding their comradeship under strain as a result.  Both try to impress her with daredevil aviation stunts which become increasingly reckless as they try to outdo each other in bravery.  Finally, Knight goes too far and crashes his plane on a mountainside.  Putting rivalry aside, Stuart courageously risks his own life to save his injured colleague and both realise that their friendship is more important than silly squabbling over a woman.  They decide to let Elena make her own choice.

The Blue Squadron is classed by the British Film Institute as a lost film.

Cast
 Esmond Knight as Captain Carlo Banti
 John Stuart as Colonel Mario Spada
 Greta Hansen as Elena
 Cecil Parker as Bianchi
 Ralph Reader as Verdi

References

External links 
 
 The Blue Squadron at BFI Film & TV Database

1934 films
1934 drama films
British drama films
British aviation films
Italian drama films
British black-and-white films
Films set in Italy
Films directed by George King
Lost British films
1934 lost films
Lost drama films
1930s English-language films
English-language Italian films
1930s British films